The Naturalized athletes of Italy are those naturalized citizens who are part, or have been part, of the Italy national athletics team.

The rules

The Italian Government and consequently FIDAL firstly, and than the IAAF, grants Italian citizenship, than the Italian passport, therefore the naturalization, to those citizens of foreign origin born in Italy (Italians therefore of second generation), or who have contracted marriage with an Italian citizen for the following reasons.

Automatically
Ius sanguinis: for birth;
If an Italian citizen recognizes, at a time after birth, a minor child;
For adoption;
To obtain or re-obtain from a parent.
Following declaration
By descent;
Ius soli: by birth or descent in Italy;
By marriage or naturalization
By marriage: the foreign or stateless spouse of an Italian citizen may acquire Italian citizenship after two years of legal residence in Italy or, if residing abroad, after three years from the date of marriage;
By naturalization: the foreigner can apply for Italian citizenship after ten years of legal residence in Italy, reduced to five years for those who have been recognized as stateless or refugee and four years for citizens of countries of the European Community.

The list
 (However, in the case of children born in Italy from foreign parents, citizenship is obtained by the eighteenth birthday).

See also

List of eligibility transfers in athletics
Italian nationality law
Naturalization – Law in Italy
Athletics in Italy
Italy national athletics team
Italy national relay team

References

External links
Cunliffe, Fiasconaro, Grenot, Martinez e gli altri: l’emigrazione sportiva, fenomeno globalizzato
La cittadinanza italiana at Italian Government web site 

 
 
Naturalised sports competitors